Mr. Houston is the fourth studio album by American R&B singer Marques Houston. It was released by MusicWorks Entertainment on September 29, 2009 in the United States, with distribution handled by Fontana, marking Houston's debut released with the label following his departure from the Universal brand in 2008. A breakaway from previous albums, the singer worked with a smaller number of collaborators on Mr. Houston, which features chief production by Noel "Detail" Fisher and Houston himself.

Critical reception 

Allmusic editor Andy Kellman rated the album two out of five stars. He found that "the disc is not the most distinctive set of the former Immature member's career, highlighted by the breezy "Express Lane" (which could have only been written in the wake of Jamie Foxx's "Blame It") and "Stranger," where Houston is at his unassuming best."

Track listing 

Notes
  signifies a co-producer

Charts

References 

Marques Houston albums
2009 albums